Livefyre was a blog comment hosting service that pioneered real-time comment sections on the web. It offered live blogging, user profiles, link aggregation, web annotation, media uploads, and moderation tools. The company was based in San Francisco with offices in New York, London, and Sydney. Livefyre was acquired by Adobe in 2016 and shut down in 2021.

History 

Livefyre was launched by Jordan Kretchmer and Henry Arlander in December 2009. It began as a commenting platform for bloggers. The company's commenting platform, Livefyre Comments 3, was launched in July 2012. In August 2013, Livefyre launched its Social Native Ad Solutions group. In November 2014, Livefyre launched a content marketing and engagement marketing platform called Livefyre Studio.

On September 9, 2013, Livefyre purchased the social media service Storify. At that time approximately 850,000 journalists, agencies and brands used Storify to curate collections of social media content. The company claimed at that time to continue making Storify available for free.

In May 2016, Adobe Systems agreed to purchase Livefyre, planning to allow customers to monetize comments made using Livefyre. In October 2016, Livefyre shut down its Community Comments WordPress plugin in order to focus exclusively on enterprise-level customers.

On December 12, 2017, Storify announced that they would be shutting down the service on May 16, 2018. Existing Storify users were encouraged to use the Storify 2 features built into Livefyre.

In January 2021, Adobe began transitioning Livefyre users away to alternate commenting platforms. On November 30th of that year, the company shut down Livefyre for all customers.

References 

Defunct technology companies of the United States
Internet forum hosting
Companies based in San Francisco
2009 establishments in California
2017 disestablishments in California